Kormiltsev (Russian: Кормильцев) is a Russian masculine surname originating from the word kormilets meaning breadwinner; its feminine counterpart is Kormiltseva. The surname may refer to:

Ilya Kormiltsev (1959–2007), Russian poet, translator, and publisher
Marina Mokhnatkina (née Kormiltseva in 1988), Russian sambo and mixed martial competitor
Nikolai Kormiltsev (born 1946), Russian military officer
Sergei Kormiltsev (born 1979), Russian football coach and former player

Russian-language surnames